Ankazomborona is a rural municipality in Madagascar. It belongs to the district of Marovoay, which is a part of Boeny Region. The population of the commune was estimated to be approximately 25,000 in 2001 commune census.

This municipality consists of 16 fokontany (villages): Ankazomborona, Madirovalo, Amboromalandikely, Madiromiongana, Ambondromamy, Mahabibo, Besaonjo, Betaramahamay, Ambonara, Morafeno Barrage, Mahatazana, Ambohimahabibo, Belinta, Antanambao-Bemikimbo, Ankazomahitsy and Beronono.

Primary and junior level secondary education are available in town. The majority 60% of the population of the commune are farmers, while an additional 30% receives their livelihood from raising livestock. The most important crop is rice, while other important products are maize and cassava.  Services provide employment for 5% of the population. Additionally, fishing employs 5% of the population.

Bodies of water 
Rivers: Bekarara, Maevajofo, Andranomiditra, Mahajamba, Karambo, Namboenana, Ampatika and Ambatomainty.
Lakes : Morafeno, Ambilivily, Amboromalandy and Matsaborikisoa. 
Sea: The Baie d'Ambaro, a RAMSAR site of 54000 ha is situated in this municipality.

Roads
Ankazomborona is crossed by the National road 4 (Mahajanga-Antananarivo) from North to South.

National Parks
Ankazomborona is situated at 23 km from the Ankarafantsika National Park.

References

jan

Populated places in Boeny